The Bentley R Type is the second series of post-war Bentley automobiles, replacing the Mark VI. Essentially a larger-boot version of the Mk VI, the R type is regarded by some as a stop-gap before the introduction of the S series cars in 1955. As with its predecessor, a standard body was available as well as coachbuilt versions by firms including H. J. Mulliner & Co., Park Ward, Harold Radford, Freestone and Webb, Carrosserie Worblaufen and others.

Similarity to Rolls-Royce Silver Dawn
Other than the radiator grilles and the carburation there was little difference between the standard Bentley R Type and the Rolls-Royce Silver Dawn. The R Type was the more popular marque. Some 2,500 units were manufactured during its run, as compared to the Silver Dawn's 760.

Design
During development it was referred to as the Bentley Mark VII; the chassis cards for these cars  describe them as Bentley 7. The R Type name which is now usually applied stems from chassis series RT. The front of the saloon model was identical to the Mark VI, but the boot (trunk) was almost doubled in capacity. The engine displacement was approximately 4½ litres, as fitted to later versions of the Mark VI. An automatic choke was fitted to the R-type's carburettor. The attachment of the rear springs to the chassis was altered in detail between the Mark VI and the R Type.

For buyers looking for a more distinctive car, a decreasing number had custom coachwork available from the dwindling number of UK coachbuilders. These ranged from the grand flowing lines of Freestone and Webb's conservative, almost prewar shapes, to the practical conversions of Harold Radford which including a clamshell style tailgate and folding rear seats.

Running gear
All R Type models use an iron-block/aluminium-head straight-six engine fed by twin SU Type H6 carburettors. The basic engine displaced  with a  bore and  stroke. A four-speed manual transmission was standard with a four-speed automatic option becoming standard on later cars.

As of 2017, it remains the last car by Bentley to be sold which has manual transmission.

Brakes and suspension
The suspension was independent at the front using coil springs with semi elliptic leaf springs at the rear. The brakes used  drums all round and were operated hydraulically at the front and mechanically at the rear via a gearbox driven servo.

Coachbuilt examples
The first example is the standard steel saloon built by Bentley, but a number of customers opted for a bare chassis which was taken to a coachbuilder of their choice.

Performance
The test car cost £4481 including taxes.

R-Type Continental

The R-Type Continental was a high-performance version of the R-Type. It was the fastest four-seat car in production at the time.

The prototype was developed by a team of designers and engineers from Rolls-Royce Ltd. and coachbuilder H. J. Mulliner & Co. led by Rolls-Royce's Chief Project Engineer, Ivan Evernden. Rolls-Royce worked with H. J. Mulliner instead of their own coachbuilding subsidiary Park Ward because the former had developed a lightweight body construction system using metal throughout instead of the traditional ash-framed bodies.

The styling, finalised by Stanley Watts of H. J. Mulliner, was influenced by aerodynamic testing conducted at Rolls-Royce's wind tunnel by Evernden's assistant, Milford Read. The rear fins stabilised the car at speed and made it resistant to changes in direction due to crosswinds.

The prototype, with chassis number 9-B-VI and registration number OLG-490, which earned it the nickname "Olga", was on the road by August 1951. Olga and the first series of production Continentals were based on the Mark VI chassis, and used a manual mixture control on the steering wheel boss, as these versions did not have an automatic choke.

The early R Type Continental has essentially the same engine as the standard R Type, but with modified carburation, induction and exhaust manifolds along with higher gear ratios. The compression ratio was raised to 7.25:1 from the standard 6.75:1, while the final gear ratio was raised (lowered numerically) from 3.41 to 3.07.

Despite its name, the two-door Continental was produced principally for the domestic home market, most of the 207 cars produced were right-hand drive, with 43 left-hand drive examples produced for use abroad. The chassis was produced at the Rolls-Royce Crewe factory and shared many components with the standard R type. R-Type Continentals were delivered as rolling chassis to the coachbuilder of choice. Coachwork for most of these cars was completed by H. J. Mulliner & Co. who mainly built them in fastback coupe form. Other coachwork came from Park Ward (London) who built six, later including a drophead coupe version. Franay (Paris) built five, Graber (Wichtrach, Switzerland) built three, one of them later altered by Köng (Basel, Switzerland), and Pininfarina made one. James Young (London) built in 1954 a Sports Saloon for the owner of the company, James Barclay.

After July 1954, the model was fitted with an engine with a larger bore of 94.62 mm (3.7 in), giving a total displacement of 4.9 L (4887 cc/298 in³).

The rarity of the R Type Continental has made the car valuable to car collectors. In 2015 a 1952 R Type Continental, in unrestored condition, sold for over $1 million USD.

Production numbers
 R Type: 2323 (295 with coachbuilt bodies)
 R Type Continental: 208 (including the prototype)

In popular culture
Skulduggery Pleasant, of the series of novels by Derek Landy, drives a 1954 Bentley R-Type.

Notes

References

R
Cars introduced in 1952
Rear-wheel-drive vehicles